KWTX-TV (channel 10) is a television station in Waco, Texas, United States, serving Central Texas as an affiliate of CBS. It is owned by Gray Television alongside Belton-licensed CW affiliate KNCT (channel 46). Both stations share studios on American Plaza in Waco, while KWTX-TV's transmitter is located near Moody, Texas.

KWTX-TV also offers Telemundo programming on its second digital subchannel. This subchannel started on January 23, 2006, as an UPN affiliate ("UPN Waco") and changed its branding to "The CW12 Central Texas" on September 15, 2006. The subchannel switched to Telemundo on January 2, 2019, after Gray Television moved its CW affiliation to former PBS member station KNCT, which it had just acquired from Central Texas College.

KBTX-TV (channel 3) in Bryan–College Station operates as a semi-satellite of KWTX-TV. As such, it simulcasts all network and syndicated programming as provided through KWTX-TV but airs separate commercial inserts, legal identifications, local newscasts and Sunday morning religious programs, and has its own website. KWTX-TV serves the western half of the Waco–Temple–Bryan market while KBTX serves the eastern portion. The two stations are counted as a single unit for ratings purposes. Although KBTX-TV maintains its own studios on East 29th Street in Bryan, master control and some internal operations are based at KWTX-TV's facilities.

History

Beginnings

KWTX first signed on the air as an independent station on April 3, 1955. It was originally owned by Texoma Broadcasting, a holding company owned by businessman Milford N. "Buddy" Bostick alongside KWTX radio (AM 1230 and FM 97.5). At the time, crosstown KANG-TV, channel 34, had the ABC, CBS and DuMont affiliations. KWTX picked up ABC in time for the fall 1955 TV season, and DuMont's closure left KANG as a full-time CBS station.

Long plagued by financial difficulties due to being the only UHF station in the market at a time when UHF tuners were rare, KANG, owned by Texas Broadcasting Company, shut down at the end of 1955. Texoma bought KANG's assets and sold a 29 percent stake in KWTX to Texas Broadcasting. KWTX picked up the CBS affiliation as a result of the merger with KANG, and has been a primary CBS affiliate ever since. It shared a secondary ABC affiliation with KCEN-TV (channel 6) until September 1, 1977, when KWTX and KBTX became primary ABC affiliates. The two stations then returned to CBS in 1983. KCEN became a primary ABC affiliate in 1984, only to reaffiliate with NBC at the end of 1985.

Texoma purchased KXII in Sherman, Texas in 1958. A year before, KBTX-TV in Bryan, Texas took to the air as semi-satellite of KWTX serving the Brazos Valley.

First live televised trial
Beginning December 6, 1955, KWTX televised the murder trial of Harry L. Washburn, marking the first live telecast of a courtroom trial in the United States. The telecast earned near universal praise from the legal community. District Judge D.W. Bartlett praised the station's crew for its unobtrusiveness: "I have not noticed anything that would in any way interfere with the administration of justice. I don't think anyone could object to the television being run while this is on. It is perfectly quiet, it's outside the jury, and there's been perfect decorum of all concerned, and I don't think there would be any reflection on any court to have this television carried on as it has been carried on in this court."

Role during Branch Davidian raid
Just before the Mount Carmel raid on February 28, 1993, Davidian learned that they were facing not a service of warrants, but a shootout. KWTX-TV cameraman James Peeler asked directions of Davidian David Jones, who was driving his postal truck. David Koresh's attorney Dick DeGuerin told reporters that Peeler told Jones, "Well, you better get out of here because there's a United States National Guard helicopter over at TSTC (Texas State Technical College) and they're going to have a big shootout with the religious nuts." Peeler was distressed to see Jones immediately drive to Mount Carmel Center and left the area to call his superiors.

According to the Treasury report, Jones told DeGuerin that "Peeler warned him not to go near the Compound as there were going to be 60 to 70 TABC (Texas Alcoholic Beverage Commission) guys in helicopters and a shoot-out would occur'." And Peeler himself confessed to the Treasury review team that he had told Jones there would be "some type of law enforcement action" and that "the action was likely to be a raid of some type and that there might be shooting."

KWTX-TV cameraman Dan Mulloney testified that KWTX-TV's initial information came from law enforcement agents he refused to name—something the Treasury report failed to reveal—as well as from a private ambulance driver working with BATF. (Similarly, BATF agent Ballesteros admitted that it was non-BATF law enforcement that tipped off the Waco Tribune-Herald.) Therefore, BATF agents' expectations of a shootout were directly transmitted to the Davidians.

Mulloney, Peeler, and reporter John McLemore, along with reporters from the Waco Tribune-Herald, were the only non-combatants at Mount Carmel that day. Mulloney shot the TV footage used around the world of agents from the Bureau of Alcohol, Tobacco, and Firearms storming the Davidians' home. Mulloney and McLemore later used their vehicle to transport injured ATF agents away from the shootout. McLemore received letter of commendation from the ATF Director for his bravery that day. However, KWTX reporters became easy targets for blame during the subsequent trials following the botched raid, particularly because Koresh learned about the approaching raid from Jones, the postal worker from which Peeler asked directions. McLemore, Peeler and Mulloney were never charged with any crime.

Gray Television ownership
On April 15, 1999, Atlanta-based Gray Communications Systems (now Gray Television) announced that it would acquire KWTX-TV, KBTX-TV, and KXII from Texoma Broadcasting for $139 million. Texoma had long owned the stations through three Bostick-controlled holding companies—KWTX Broadcasting, Inc., Brazos Broadcasting, Inc., and KXII Broadcasters, Inc., respectively. The decision to sell the stations stemmed from recommendations by shareholders of the companies because of the costs that the Bostick companies would incur in launching and operating digital television signals for the three stations, with Gray CEO Hilton H. Howell Jr. (a Waco native and shareholder in KWTX) inquiring about purchasing the stations after Bostick was initially unsuccessful in reaching sale agreements with prospective buyers. Through the transaction, which was finalized on October 1, 1999, Gray paid $41.5 million in cash as well as additional cash payments for certain accounts receivable to purchase channel 12 from Bostick-owned KXII Broadcasters Inc.

On August 28, 2018, it was reported that the Central Texas College Board of Trustees had voted to assign the broadcast license of PBS member station KNCT to Gray, which would create a duopoly with KWTX-TV. This was possible because KNCT broadcasts on a channel not reserved for non-commercial broadcasting. The sale was approved by the FCC on December 12, and it was completed on December 17. KNCT returned to the air on January 2, 2019, taking CW programming from KWTX-TV.

Programming

Syndicated programming
Syndicated programming currently broadcast on KWTX-TV includes The Ellen DeGeneres Show, Tamron Hall, Rachael Ray, Entertainment Tonight, Castle, NCIS and NCIS: New Orleans.

Sports programming
KWTX airs select Baylor Bears men's basketball games through CBS' broadcast rights with NCAA Basketball. This includes the team's victory in the 2021 NCAA Division I Men's Basketball Championship Game, their first in program history.

Technical information

Subchannels
The station's digital signal is multiplexed:

Analog-to-digital conversion
KWTX-TV shut down its analog signal, over VHF channel 10, on February 17, 2009, the original target date in which full-power television stations in the United States were to transition from analog to digital broadcasts under federal mandate (which was later pushed back to June 12, 2009). The station's digital signal relocated from its pre-transition UHF channel 53, which was among the high band UHF channels (52–69) that were removed from broadcasting use as a result of the transition, to its analog-era VHF channel 10 for post-transition operations.

See also
KBTX-TV

References

External links

CW 12 website

Gray Television
CBS network affiliates
Telemundo network affiliates
MeTV affiliates
WTX-TV
Television channels and stations established in 1955
1955 establishments in Texas